St. Mary's College, Thoothukudi, is a women's general degree college located in Thoothukudi, Tamil Nadu. It was established in the year 1948. The college is affiliated with Manonmaniam Sundaranar University. This college offers different courses in arts, commerce and science.

Departments

Science
Physics
Chemistry
Mathematics
Botany
Zoology
Computer Science

Arts and Commerce
Tami
Computer Application

English
Economics
History
Commerce

Accreditation
The college is  recognized by the University Grants Commission (UGC).

References

External links

Educational institutions established in 1948
1948 establishments in India
Colleges affiliated to Manonmaniam Sundaranar University
Universities and colleges in Thoothukudi district
Academic institutions formerly affiliated with the University of Madras